Breed of the Border is a 1933 American Western feature film directed by Robert N. Bradbury and starring Bob Steele. It was distributed through Monogram Pictures.

A print is preserved in the Library of Congress collection.

Cast
Bob Steele as Speed Brent
Marion Byron as Sonia Bedford
Ernie Adams as Joe the Killer
George "Gabby" Hayes as Chuck Wiggins (credited as George Hayes)
Henry Roquemore as Dutch Krause
Fred Cavens as Mike (credited as Fred Cavins)
John Elliott as Judge Stafford
Perry Murdock as Red, a Henchman
Bob Card as Spud, a Henchman
Horace B. Carpenter as Dr. Bates (uncredited)
Joe Dominguez as Pedro (uncredited)
Jack Evans as Dugan - Barfly (uncredited)
Herman Hack as Barfly (uncredited)
Ray Jones as Saloon Brawler (uncredited)
William McCall as Barfly (uncredited)
George Morrell as Barfly (uncredited)
Fred Parker as Barfly (uncredited)
Hal Price as Border Inspector (uncredited)
Blackie Whiteford as Saloon Brawler (uncredited)

References

External links

1933 films
Monogram Pictures films
1933 Western (genre) films
American Western (genre) films
American black-and-white films
Films with screenplays by Harry L. Fraser
1930s American films